Elmira is a ghost town in Center Township, Mitchell County, Kansas, United States.

History
Elmira was issued a post office in 1872. The post office was discontinued in 1895.

References

Former populated places in Mitchell County, Kansas
Former populated places in Kansas